Robert James "Bobby" Dawes (November 29, 1924 – May 26, 2003) was a Canadian ice hockey defenceman. He played 32 games in the National Hockey League with the Toronto Maple Leafs and Montreal Canadiens between 1947 and 1951. The rest of his career, which lasted from 1945 to 1967, was spent in various minor leagues. He won the Stanley Cup in 1949 with the Maple Leafs.

Playing career
Dawes began his National Hockey League career with the Toronto Maple Leafs in 1947. He would also play for the Montreal Canadiens. He left the NHL following the 1951 season and played in the minor leagues until 1961–62 before retiring from hockey. He won the Stanley Cup in 1949 with the Maple Leafs.

Career statistics

Regular season and playoffs

External links 

1924 births
2003 deaths
Buffalo Bisons (AHL) players
Canadian expatriate ice hockey players in the United States
Canadian ice hockey defencemen
Cincinnati Mohawks (AHL) players
Cleveland Barons (1937–1973) players
Ice hockey people from Saskatchewan
Johnstown Jets players
Montreal Canadiens players
Montreal Royals (QSHL) players
New Haven Eagles players
New Westminster Royals (WHL) players
Oshawa Generals players
Pittsburgh Hornets players
Seattle Ironmen players
Sportspeople from Saskatoon
Springfield Indians players
Stanley Cup champions
Toronto Maple Leafs players